Pierre Thomas could refer to:

Pierre Thomas (American football) (born 1984), American football player
Pierre Thomas (journalist), American journalist
Pierre Thomas (scholar) (1634–1698), French scholar and author
Pierre “P” Thomas (Co-founder of Quality Control Music)